Tungsten has several oxidation states, and therefore oxides:

Tungsten(III) oxide
Tungsten(IV) oxide, also known as tungsten dioxide
Tungsten(VI) oxide, also known as tungsten trioxide
Tungsten pentoxide